Global Mall Nangang Station is a shopping mall in Nangang District, Taipei, Taiwan that opened on July 26, 2016. It is the seventh store of Global Mall.

Gallery

See also
 List of tourist attractions in Taiwan
 Ruentex Nangang Station Complex
 Global Mall Taoyuan A8
 Global Mall Xinzuoying Station
 Global Mall Pingtung
 Global Mall Zhonghe
 Global Mall Banqiao Station

References

External links

2016 establishments in Taiwan
Shopping malls in Taipei
Shopping malls established in 2016